Jagwar Ma is an Australian psychedelic dance band formed in Sydney in 2011. It consists of Gabriel Winterfield (lead vocalist, guitarist), Jono Ma (guitar, beats, synths, production), and bass guitarist Jack Freeman, who joined 2012. The band name is derived from a satirical compound of the word "jaguar" and Jono's surname. In 2013, Jagwar Ma signed with record labels Mom+Pop (US), Marathon Artists (EU), and Future Classic (Australia) and released its debut album Howlin. It released its second album Every Now and Then on 14 October 2016.

Career
Ma and Winterfield met in 2007. At this time, both were playing in different groups, Lost Valentinos and Ghostwood. It would be until mid-2010 at an FLRL performance that the two shared the stage. FLRL was a locally based krautrock experimental pop group - initially founded by Jono Ma, Kirin J. Callinan and Julian Sudek - local musicians would get together, curate an evening of new music, and perform it to an audience. One night, Winterfield took vocals and guitar and Ma generated sounds from the use of vintage drum machines, radio frequency manipulation, improvised percussion, and other esoteric methods of creating sound. By 2011, Ma and Winterfield began frequently getting together at a studio (often a living room) and recording sounds and melodies, whilst also swapping old demos from unfinished side projects, "Jaguar Paw" and "Flintstone". Subsequently, loose jams and recordings started as anything from Motown to electronica. It would be during these recording sessions that the band's first songs "Come Save Me" and "What Love" would emerge. At this point, the pair decided to semi relocate to France and to extend what was originally "going to be a one off 7 inch single" to a full LP.<ref>{{Cite news|url=http://www.redbull.com/us/en/music/stories/1331674811164/jagwar-ma-long-fascinating-journey-to-howlin|title=Jagwar Ma's Long, Fascinating Journey to 'Howlin|last=Alexis|first=Jeremiah|access-date=2016-11-19}}</ref> Jack Freeman, a London-based musician and old friend joined the live lineup mid-2012. In June 2013, the band released Howlin, which reached the UK album chart. In 2015, the band toured as support to Tame Impala.

The duo began writing material at their Crescent Head studio rural Australia, before returning to the farmhouse in La Briche, France to record. The record was finalised in London and featured guest appearances by Stella Mozgawa, Ewan Pearson and James Ford. In May 2016, Ma confirmed that the second album would be released in the second half of 2016. The band released the first single, "O B 1" in July, followed by a second  "Give Me A Reason" in August 2016. The 11-track album, Every Now & Then, was released on 14 October 2016. Musicfeeds maintainted that it "rewards a dedicated listener with a fine-tuned ear". NME gave the album four out of five stars, calling it "a mind-altering second album with melody at its heart" DIY Magazine said the album had Jagwar Ma "on a process of self-discovery, just a couple of steps away from striking gold." The band embarked on a headlining tour in support. The group is not affiliated with Alibaba Group founder Jack Ma.

In 2018, the band began recording sessions in Iceland, however further tours and recordings were delayed by an illness which confined Ma to Australia. According to Jono, the band has "by no means disbanded". Both members have embarked on separate projects. Winterfield began a "surf blues" solo project as Golf Alpha Bravo, releasing singles "Groove Baby Groove", "Unwind", and "Blue Wave" via Mom+Pop Records in 2019. His full length debut album, The Sundog, was released on his own label, Treasured Recordings, on 12 June 2020. Jono Ma started an ongoing project with Jonti called Mystics, who released their first single, "Steppers" in 2019, and performed live at Carriageworks in 2022. He also released an EP in collaboration with Dreems titled The Dreemas on Kompact in 2018, and a cover of Kraftwerk's "Neon Lights" on Bandcamp in 2020, in memory of Florian Schneider and Andrew Weatherall, with proceeds benefiting The Aboriginal Legal Service.

Touring & Shows
In 2014, Jagwar Ma played the Summer Festival circuit throughout the UK, EU and Australia including Reading and Leeds, Glastonbury, Pukkelpop, Latitude, Bestival, Paredes de Coura Festival, The Big Day Out, Splendour in the Grass among others. Jagwar Ma has played sold out headline tours in the UK, France, Australia and the US.

In 2017, Jagwar Ma played at Summer Bright Lager’s Summer Sessions Tour and at Coachella. In the summer of 2017, the band performed at Panorama Music Festival on Randall's Island in New York City and England's Glastonbury Festival.

In 2018, Jagwar Ma performed at Dark Mofo in Tasmania, headlining a Red Bull Music lineup.

Members
 Gabriel Winterfield – lead vocals, guitar
 Jono Ma – guitar, synths, drum machines, samplers, producer
 Jack Freeman  – bass

Discography
Studio albums

EPs

Singles

Awards
AIR Awards
The Australian Independent Record Awards (commonly known informally as AIR Awards) is an annual awards night to recognise, promote and celebrate the success of Australia's Independent Music sector.

|-
| rowspan="6" | AIR Awards of 2013
| themselves 
| Best Independent Artist
| 
|-
| rowspan="2" | ''Howlin
| Independent Album of the Year
| 
|-
| Best Independent Dance/Electronic Club Album
| 
|-
| rowspan="2" | "Man I Need"
| Independent Single of the Year
| 
|-
| Best Independent Dance/Electronic Club Song or EP
| 
|-
|themselves 
|Carlton Dry Global Music Grant
| 
|-
| AIR Awards of 2017
| Every Now and Then
| Best Independent Dance/Electronic Album
| 
|-

APRA Awards
The APRA Awards are presented annually from 1982 by the Australasian Performing Right Association (APRA), "honouring composers and songwriters". They commenced in 1982.

! 
|-
| 2014 
| Jagwar Ma
| Breakthrough Songwriter of the Year
| 
| 
|-

Australian Music Prize
The Australian Music Prize (the AMP) is an annual award of $30,000 given to an Australian band or solo artist in recognition of the merit of an album released during the year of award. The commenced in 2005.

|-
| 2013
|Howlin'''
| Australian Music Prize
| 
|-

J Award
The J Awards are an annual series of Australian music awards that were established by the Australian Broadcasting Corporation's youth-focused radio station Triple J. They commenced in 2005.

|-
| J Awards of 2013
|Howlin'''
| Australian Album of the Year
|

References

External links
 

Australian rock music groups
Musical groups from Sydney
Mom + Pop Music artists